Exar may refer to:

 Amectran Exar-1, 1979 electric car
 Exar Corporation, American semiconductor manufacturer
 Exar Kun, Star Wars character
 Exar Rosales (born 1984), Peruvian football player